The W.A.R. P-47 Thunderbolt is a half-scale homebuilt replica of a P-47 Thunderbolt fighter, produced as a kit by War Aircraft Replicas International, Inc. for amateur construction.

Design
All WAR replicas share a common wooden primary structure. A secondary foam and fiberglass structure shape the aircraft to roughly match the aircraft it is replicating. The P-47 uses uni-directional fiberglass layup on the fuselage, and bi-directional layup on the elliptical wings. A bisected mockup was first presented at the EAA airshow in 1976.

Specifications (W.A.R. P-47 Thunderbolt)

Notes

References

WAR P-47 Thunderbolt

External links
 War Aircraft Replicas International Inc 
 W.A.R. Aircraft Replicas International

Homebuilt aircraft
P-47
Single-engined tractor aircraft
1970s United States sport aircraft
Replica aircraft
Low-wing aircraft